Ḩaşbān A'la is a sub-district located in the Al-Misrakh District, Taiz Governorate, Yemen. Ḩaşbān A'la had a population of 5,026 according to the 2004 census.

Villages
Bayiys village.
Al-Sina' village.
Al-Jarinuh village.
Al-Nabirah Al'ulya village.
Al-Hanna village.
Al-'Ashiyn village.
Al-'Adan village.
Mashra'ah village.
Al-nabirah Al-suflaa village.

References

Sub-districts in Al-Misrakh District